Carlos Gómez-Herrera (born 30 April 1990) is a Spanish tennis player.

Gómez-Herrera has a career high ATP singles ranking of World No. 268 achieved on 7 May 2018. He has a career high ATP doubles ranking of World No. 195 achieved on 26 July 2021.

Gómez-Herrera made his ATP main draw debut at the 2012 Serbia Open in the singles draw after he qualified for the tournament. He lost in the first round to Victor Hănescu.

In 2021 he played doubles at the ATP 250 Mallorca tournament on grass alongside world No. 1 in singles Novak Djokovic. They defeated Tomislav Brkić and Nikola Ćaćić in the first round after saving two match points in the third-set match tiebreak. They advanced to the semifinals by beating top seeded Marcel Granollers and Horacio Zeballos, again in the third-set match tiebreak. They subsequently defeated third seeded Oliver Marach and Aisam-ul-Haq Qureshi to reach the final but they withdrew before the championship match with Gómez-Herrera citing an ankle injury. As a result he made his debut in the top 200 in doubles at World No. 197 on 28 June 2021.

ATP career finals

Doubles: 1 (1 runner-up)

ATP Challenger and ITF Futures finals

Singles: 16 (10–6)

Doubles: 16 (8–8)

References

External links
 
 

1990 births
Living people
Spanish male tennis players
Tennis players from Andalusia
21st-century Spanish people